Palcoscenico Records was a short-lived Italian jazz record label.

Discography
 15001: Gaetano Liguori – Terzo Mondo
 15002: George Adams & Don Pullen – All That Funk (with Cameron Brown, Dannie Richmond)
 15003: George Adams & Don Pullen – More Funk (with Cameron Brown, Dannie Richmond)
 15004: Claudio Fasoli New Quartet – Cloudy
 15005: Art Blakey – One by One (with Curtis Fuller, Bobby Watson, David Schnitter, James Williams, Dennis Irwin, Valery Ponomarev)
 15006: Leon Thomas – A Piece of Cake (with Freddie Hubbard, Hadley Caliman, Billy Childs, Larry Klein, Carl Burnett)
 15007: Karl Berger – New Moon
 15008: Walter Davis, Jr. – Uranus
 15009: Milt Jackson – Loose Walk (with Sonny Stitt, Gerald Price, Don Moses, Bobby Durham)

References

Italian record labels
Jazz record labels
Defunct record labels of Italy